Connor Tong Hew Fung (born 29 January 2002) is a Hong Kong professional footballer who is currently a free agent.

Career statistics

Club

Notes

References

Living people
2002 births
Hong Kong footballers
Association football forwards
Hong Kong Premier League players
Kitchee SC players